Telstra Research Laboratories (TRL) was a leading telecommunications research and development centre in Australia up until its closure in January 2006.  Shortly before its closure it employed several hundred people including engineers, scientists, psychologists and other technical staff spread over several locations including Melbourne, Sydney and Launceston (Tasmania).

The closure of TRL, with retrenchment of about 90% of its staff, was part of a broader restructure of Telstra's Network and Technology group following the announcement in November 2005 of the outcome of a strategic review led by new CEO Sol Trujillo.  The new operating model places more emphasis on the reliance on key vendor partners, rather than the traditional in-house expertise that TRL provided to assist Telstra in being an intelligent purchaser of equipment and systems.

Telstra is Australia's dominant telecommunications carrier.

History 
TRL was originally established as the Research Laboratories of the Postmaster-General's Department in 1923. The Research Laboratories continued as PMG became Telecom Australia and later became Telstra, and was responsible for the development of several key technologies. Notable achievements included a part in the development of radar for WW2, the first fax service in Australia, the first public TV broadcast in Australia, developed termite-resistant cabling, assisted with the development of the bionic ear and the cochlear ear implant, developed the optical fibre cold clamp, built the first system to route calls to a single number to destination depending on location (One3), and even demonstrated a working Internet fridge.

References

External links 
 Unofficial TRL history and Chronicles of Trel

Research institutes in Australia
Telstra